Edwin Levon Nelson (February 10, 1940 – May 17, 2003) was a United States district judge of the United States District Court for the Northern District of Alabama.

Education and career

Born in Brewton, Alabama, Nelson was in the United States Navy from 1958 to 1962. He received a Bachelor of Laws from Cumberland School of Law at Samford University in 1969, and was in private practice in Fort Payne, Alabama from 1969 to 1974.

Federal judicial service

Nelson served as a United States magistrate judge for the Northern District of Alabama from 1974 to 1990. On September 13, 1989, he was nominated by President George H. W. Bush to a seat on the United States District Court for the Northern District of Alabama vacated by Junius Foy Guin Jr. Nelson was confirmed by the United States Senate on January 23, 1990, and received his commission on January 24, 1990. Nelson served in that capacity until his death, on May 17, 2003, of bone marrow cancer.

References

Sources

1940 births
2003 deaths
People from Brewton, Alabama
Judges of the United States District Court for the Northern District of Alabama
United States district court judges appointed by George H. W. Bush
20th-century American judges
United States Navy sailors
Cumberland School of Law alumni
United States magistrate judges